is a former Japanese football player.

Playing career
Saito was born in Muroran on September 18, 1979. After graduating from Kokushikan University, he joined J2 League club Cerezo Osaka in 2002. Although he could not play at all in the match, Cerezo was promoted to J1 League end of 2002 season. He debuted as center back in 2003 and played many matches until 2004. In April 2005, he moved to newly was promoted to J2 club Thespa Kusatsu. He became a regular center back and played many matches in 2 seasons. In 2007, he moved to Japan Football League club FC Gifu. He retired end of 2007 season.

Club statistics

References

External links

cerezo-museum.com
library.footballjapan.jp

1979 births
Living people
Kokushikan University alumni
Association football people from Hokkaido
Japanese footballers
J1 League players
J2 League players
Japan Football League players
Cerezo Osaka players
Thespakusatsu Gunma players
FC Gifu players
Association football defenders
People from Muroran, Hokkaido